Ulster County is a county in the U.S. state of New York. It is situated along the Hudson River. As of the 2020 census, the population was 181,851. The county seat is Kingston. The county is named after the Irish province of Ulster.

History

Founding and formation
When part of the New Netherland colony, Dutch traders first called the area of present-day Ulster County "Esopus", a name borrowed for convenience from a locality on the opposite side of the Hudson. The local Lenape indigenous people called themselves Waranawanka, but soon came to be known to the Dutch as the "Esopus Indians" because they were encountered around the settlement known as Esopus. In 1652, Thomas Chambers, a freeholder from the Manor of Rensselaerswyck, purchased land at Esopus. He and several others actually settled and began farming by June, 1653. The settlements grew into the village of Wiltwijck, which the English later named Kingston. In 1683, the Duke of York created 12 counties in his province, one of which was Ulster County, named after Prince James, Duke of York (later King James II of England) whose subsidiary titles included Earl of Ulster. Its boundaries at that time included the present Sullivan County and parts of the present Delaware, Orange, and Greene Counties.

In 1777, the first state capital of the independent New York State was established at Kingston. The official records of Ulster County were removed to safety to a stone house in Kerhonkson when it became evident that the British would burn Kingston.

In 1797, parts of Otsego and Ulster Counties were split off to create Delaware County.

In 1798, Ulster County's southernmost towns were moved into Orange County to compensate Orange for breaking away its southernmost part to form Rockland County.

In 1800, portions of Albany and Ulster Counties were split off to create Greene County.

In 1809, Sullivan County was split off from Ulster County.

Civil War
During the American Civil War, volunteers were recruited from the county and formed the majority of the following regiments:
80th New York Volunteer Infantry Regiment
120th New York Volunteer Infantry
156th New York Volunteer Infantry

Other regiments with at least one company from the county included:
1st Battalion New York Volunteer Sharpshooters
1st New York Volunteer Engineer Regiment
7th Regiment New York Volunteer Cavalry
7th New York Veteran Infantry Regiment
15th Regiment New York Volunteer Cavalry
20th New York Volunteer Infantry Regiment
25th Regiment New York Volunteer Cavalry
25th New York Volunteer Infantry Regiment
56th New York Volunteer Infantry
65th New York Volunteer Infantry
71st New York Infantry
102nd New York Volunteer Infantry
132nd New York Volunteer Infantry Regiment
168th New York Volunteer Infantry
176th New York Volunteer Infantry
178th New York Volunteer Infantry Regiment
192nd New York Volunteer Infantry

Twentieth century
The Lake Mohonk Mountain House on Shawangunk Ridge was designated a National Historic Landmark in 1986.

Geography

Ulster County is in southeastern New York State, south of Albany, immediately west of the Hudson River. Much of it is within the Catskill Mountains and the Shawangunk Ridge. Ulster County has Minnewaska State Park Preserve, Mohonk Preserve, Sundown State Park, VerNooykill State Forest, Witches Hole State Forest, and Shawangunk Ridge State Forest. The Sam's Point section of Minnewaska includes rare dwarf pine trees and Verkeerder Kill falls.

The lowest point is sea level along the Hudson River.

Adjacent counties
 Greene County — north
 Columbia County — northeast
 Dutchess County — southeast
 Orange County — south
 Sullivan County — southwest
 Delaware County — northwest

National protected area
 Shawangunk Grasslands National Wildlife Refuge

Demographics

As of the census of 2010, the county had 181,440 people, 67,499 households, and 43,536 families. There were 77,656 housing units at an average density of 69 per square mile (27/km2). The county's racial makeup, as of 2008, was 83.2% white, 6.50% black or African American, 0.3% Native American, 1.7% Asian, 0.03% Pacific Islander, 2.15% from other races, and 1.70% from two or more races. 7.6% of the population were Hispanic or Latino of any race. 19.2% were of Italian, 16.8% Irish, 15.5% German, 6.8% English, and 4.7% American ancestry according to Census 2000. 90.3% spoke English, 4.5% Spanish, 1.2% Italian, and 1.0% German as their first language.

There were 67,499 households, of which 30.70% had children under age 18 living with them, 49.20% were married couples living together, 10.90% had a female householder with no husband present, and 35.50% were non-families. Of all households, 27.90% were made up of individuals, and 10.20% had someone living alone who was 65 years of age or older. The average household size was 2.47 and the average family size was 3.03.

23.50% of the county's population was under age 18, 8.70% was from age 18 to 24, 29.70% was from age 25 to 44, 24.70% was from age 45 to 64, and 13.30% was age 65 or older. The median age was 38 years. For every 100 females, there were 99.10 males. For every 100 females age 18 and over, there were 96.60 males.

The county's median household income was $42,551, and the median family income was $51,708. Males had a median income of $36,808 versus $27,086 for females. The per capita income for the county was $20,846. About 7.20% of families and 11.40% of the population were below the poverty line, including 13.00% of those under age 18 and 8.70% of those age 65 or over.

2020 Census
As of the 2020 census the population of Ulster County is 181,851. The county's racial makeup, as of 2020, was 75.16% white, 5.8% black or African American, 0.2% Native American, 2.1% Asian, 0.02% Pacific Islander, 5.4% from other races or from two or more races. 11.61% of the population were Hispanic or Latino of any race

Government and politics

|}

For most of the 20th century, Ulster County voted for the Republican nominees for president. Republicans regularly got over 60% of the vote, the high point coming when Dwight D. Eisenhower won 76% in 1956. The Democratic nominee won only in 1912, when Theodore Roosevelt and his Progressive Party split the Republican vote and gave a plurality to Woodrow Wilson, and in 1964, when Lyndon B. Johnson won every county in New York and carried Ulster County by 19.8 percentage points.

More recently, Ulster County has voted Democratic. In 1992, 1996, and 2000, the party won a plurality, due to strong showings from third parties. In 2004, John Kerry defeated George W. Bush, 54%–43%; in 2008, Barack Obama defeated John McCain, 61%–37%; in 2012, Obama defeated Mitt Romney, 60%–37%; in 2016, Hillary Clinton defeated Donald Trump, 52%–41%; and in 2020, Joe Biden defeated Trump, 60%–39%.

As of 2023, most of the county is in New York's 18th congressional district, represented by Democrat Pat Ryan. Some of the west and north of the county is in New York's 19th congressional district, represented by Republican Marc Molinaro. It had no U.S. representative after Antonio Delgado resigned on May 25, 2022, to become lieutenant governor of New York. Ryan won a special election on August 23 against Molinaro, and was sworn in on September 13. On September 9, Ryan stepped down as county executive, and Johanna Contreras was sworn in as an acting county executive. Ryan ran in the 18th congressional district in the 2022 general election after redistricting put most of Ulster County in that district. Ryan was narrowly reelected against New York Assembly member Colin Schmitt. Molinaro ran in the 19th district and narrowly defeated Democrat Josh Riley. Democrat Jen Metzger, a former New York State Senator, defeated Republican Jim Quigley in the 2022 election to replace Ryan. Metzger took office in 2023.

County government
For a long time, Ulster County had a county-scale version of a council-manager government, with the county legislature hiring a county administrator to handle executive functions. The chair of the legislature had a great deal of power and was accountable only to the voters of their district. The only countywide elected officials were the county clerk (Nina Postupack has served since 2006), district attorney (Dave Clegg took office in 2020) and sheriff (Juan Figueroa took office in 2019).

In 2006, voters approved the first-ever county charter, changing to an elected executive branch. Two years later, Michael P. Hein, the last appointed county administrator, became Ulster's first elected county executive. In early 2019, Hein resigned to accept Governor Andrew Cuomo's appointment as commissioner of the state Office of Temporary and Disability Assistance. Deputy County Executive Adele Reiter succeeded him as acting county executive until a special election was held in April 2019.

On April 30, 2019, Democrat Patrick K. Ryan was elected in a special election by a margin of 74%-26%. He was sworn in as Ulster County's second County Executive on June 7, 2019.

Legislative authority is vested in the County Legislature, which consists of 23 members elected from individual districts, as directed by a county charter reapportionment mandate starting in late 2010. Of the members of the County Legislature, 16 are part of the Democratic Caucus (15 affiliated with the Democratic Party and 1 unaffiliated), and 7 are part of the Republican Caucus (all 7 are affiliated with the Republican Party).

Recreation

Ulster County contains a large part of Catskill Park and the Catskill Forest Preserve. The former Delaware and Hudson Canal brought Pennsylvania coal to Kingston on the Hudson. Former Orleans band member John Hall served in the Ulster County legislature before moving to the 19th Congressional District to run for Congress.

Ulster County has continued to be a popular vacation destination for many decades. The County is home to many outdoor landscapes, including the Catskill Mountains, the Hudson River, Minnewaska State Park, Catskill Park, Shawangunk Mountains and the Shawangunk Ridge. Each offers various recreation opportunities, including hiking, bicycling, skiing, horseback riding, kayaking, rock climbing, hunting and fishing.

The Walkway Over the Hudson, the world's longest pedestrian and bicycle bridge which spans the Hudson River, is connected within Ulster County trails.

Ulster County has also played a role in some significant moments in U.S. history. The Senate House State Historic Site in Kingston, New York is where, in early 1777, American colonists met to ratify the New York Constitution.

The Ulster County Fair has been held in New Paltz for many years and is promoted as "The Best Six Days of Summer". County run recreation areas include the Ulster County Pool in New Paltz and the Ulster Landing Park in Saugerties.

Since 2016, Kingston Stockade FC, a semi-professional soccer team that plays in the National Premier Soccer League (NPSL), has been based in Kingston and plays its home matches at Dietz Stadium.

Also since 2015, the Saugerties Stallions, a collegiate summer baseball league team that plays in the Perfect Game Collegiate Baseball League (PGCBL), have been based in Saugerties and play their home games at Cantine Field. The Stallions won the 2021 PGCBL Championship.

Transportation 
Public transportation in Ulster County is provided by Trailways of New York to and from New York City and Albany, and along Routes 28 and 32, by Ulster County Area Transit on major state and U.S. road corridors in the county, and by Kingston Citibus in Kingston.

Major Roadways 
The New York State Thruway (I-87) runs north–south through the county, carrying traffic between New York City and Albany and its surroundings. NY 55, NY 52, and NY 28 are all major east-west highways that run through the county, and US 209, US 9W, and NY 32 are major north-south highways.

Communities

City
 Kingston (county seat)

Towns

 Denning
 Esopus
 Gardiner
 Hardenburgh
 Hurley
 Kingston
 Lloyd
 Marbletown
 Marlborough
 New Paltz
 Olive
 Plattekill
 Rochester
 Rosendale
 Saugerties
 Shandaken
 Shawangunk
 Ulster
 Wawarsing
 Woodstock

Villages
 Ellenville
 New Paltz
 Saugerties

Census-designated places

 Accord
 Clintondale
 Cragsmoor
 East Kingston
 Gardiner
 Glasco
 High Falls
 Highland
 Hillside
 Hurley
 Kerhonkson
 Lake Katrine
 Lincoln Park
 Malden-on-Hudson
 Marlboro
 Milton
 Napanoch
 Phoenicia
 Pine Hill
 Plattekill
 Port Ewen
 Rifton
 Rosendale
 Ruby
 Saugerties South
 Shokan
 Stone Ridge
 Tillson
 Walker Valley
 Wallkill
 Watchtower
 West Hurley
 Woodstock
 Zena

Hamlets

 Bearsville
 Big Indian
 Boiceville
 Brown's Station
 Centerville
 Chichester
 Cottekill
 Kaatsbaan
 Krumville
 Lew Beach
 Modena
 Mt. Pleasant
 Mt. Tremper
 Olivebridge
 Oliverea
 Palentown
 Samsonville
 Seager
 Shady
 Spring Glen
 Sundown
 Tabasco
 West Park
 West Saugerties
 West Shokan
 Willow

See also

 List of counties in New York
 National Register of Historic Places listings in Ulster County, New York

Notes

References

Bibliography

External links

 Ulster County web site
 
 Ulster County Alive
 Guide to the Ulster County Collection, 1666-1893

 
Catskills
Hudson Valley
Counties in the New York metropolitan area
1683 establishments in the Province of New York
Populated places established in 1683